This was the first edition of the tournament.

Andrea Collarini and Andrés Molteni won the tournament, defeating James Cerretani and Costin Pavăl in the final, 6–3, 7–5.

Seeds 

  Nicolás Barrientos /  Sergio Galdós (quarterfinals)
  Lee Hsin-han /  Alessandro Motti (quarterfinals)
  James Cerretani /  Costin Pavăl
  Flavio Cipolla /  Dino Marcan (first round)

Draw

Draw

References
 Main Draw

Blu-Express.com Tennis Cup - Doubles
2015 Doubles